Felsham is a village and civil parish in the Mid Suffolk district of Suffolk in eastern England. In 2005 its population was 420.

History
The origin of the name "Felsham" is not clear, but one theory gives its meaning as Faela or "pleasant enclosure". Felsham was listed as Fealsham in the Domesday Book of 1086.

Church
The church of St Peter serves the parish of Felsham. The present church was largely built in the 14th and 15th century and has an impressive north porch. The interior was unsympathetically renovated during the 19th century.

Village life
The village is home to the Six Bells public house. Parts of the present building date from the 16th century, though it was largely rebuilt in the 19th and 20th centuries.
Felsham was also the home of the Mudlen End Studio, which produced ceramic models of mainly cottages and dwellings from the local area.

References

External links
Village website
Felsham & Gedding History Group
Felsham history
The walker's guide to Felsham
Mudlen End Studio Collection

Villages in Suffolk
Civil parishes in Suffolk
Mid Suffolk District
Thedwastre Hundred